Order to View is an early television series which aired on the BBC for four episodes (two in 1938, two in 1939). A live variety show, those who appeared included Billy Milton, Edward Cooper, Sepha Treble, Ena Moon, Warren Jenkins, and Nadine March. It was written by Michael Treford. The time-slots it aired in ranged from 30 minutes to 45 minutes.

None of the episodes still exist, as methods to record live television had not been developed. A 6-minute fragment from the 1947 special Variety in Sepia is the oldest surviving telerecording of a BBC TV variety show.

References

External links
Order to View on IMDb

1930s British television series
1938 British television series debuts
1939 British television series endings
Lost BBC episodes
BBC Television shows
British live television series
Black-and-white British television shows
British variety television shows